Gorseinon railway station served the town of Gorseinon, in the historical county of Glamorganshire, Wales, from 1867 to 1964 on the Llanelly Railway.

History 
The station was opened as Loughor Common on 14 December 1867 by the London and North Western Railway. Its name was changed to  Gorseinon for Loughor on 1 February 1868 and changed to Gorseinon in 1874. It was also known as Gorseinon Road in the local papers. The station closed on 15 June 1964.

References 

Disused railway stations in Carmarthenshire
Former London and North Western Railway stations
Beeching closures in Wales
Railway stations in Great Britain opened in 1867
Railway stations in Great Britain closed in 1964
1867 establishments in Wales
1964 disestablishments in Wales